In geometry, a demihepteract or 7-demicube is a uniform 7-polytope, constructed from the 7-hypercube (hepteract) with alternated vertices removed. It is part of a dimensionally infinite family of uniform polytopes called demihypercubes.

E. L. Elte identified it in 1912 as a semiregular polytope, labeling it as HM7 for a 7-dimensional half measure polytope.

Coxeter named this polytope as 141 from its Coxeter diagram, with a ring on one of the 1-length branches,  and Schläfli symbol  or {3,34,1}.

Cartesian coordinates 
Cartesian coordinates for the vertices of a demihepteract centered at the origin are alternate halves of the hepteract:
 (±1,±1,±1,±1,±1,±1,±1)
with an odd number of plus signs.

Images

As a configuration
This configuration matrix represents the 7-demicube. The rows and columns correspond to vertices, edges, faces, cells, 4-faces, 5-faces and 6-faces. The diagonal numbers say how many of each element occur in the whole 7-demicube. The nondiagonal numbers say how many of the column's element occur in or at the row's element.

The diagonal f-vector numbers are derived through the Wythoff construction, dividing the full group order of a subgroup order by removing one mirror at a time.

Related polytopes 

There are 95 uniform polytopes with D6 symmetry, 63 are shared by the B6 symmetry, and 32 are unique:

References 

 H.S.M. Coxeter: 
 Coxeter, Regular Polytopes, (3rd edition, 1973), Dover edition, p. 296, Table I (iii): Regular Polytopes, three regular polytopes in n-dimensions (n≥5)
 H.S.M. Coxeter, Regular Polytopes, 3rd Edition, Dover New York, 1973, p. 296, Table I (iii): Regular Polytopes, three regular polytopes in n-dimensions (n≥5)
 Kaleidoscopes: Selected Writings of H.S.M. Coxeter, edited by F. Arthur Sherk, Peter McMullen, Anthony C. Thompson, Asia Ivic Weiss, Wiley-Interscience Publication, 1995,  
 (Paper 22) H.S.M. Coxeter, Regular and Semi Regular Polytopes I, [Math. Zeit. 46 (1940) 380-407, MR 2,10]
 (Paper 23) H.S.M. Coxeter, Regular and Semi-Regular Polytopes II, [Math. Zeit. 188 (1985) 559-591]
 (Paper 24) H.S.M. Coxeter, Regular and Semi-Regular Polytopes III, [Math. Zeit. 200 (1988) 3-45]
 John H. Conway, Heidi Burgiel, Chaim Goodman-Strass, The Symmetries of Things 2008,  (Chapter 26. pp. 409: Hemicubes: 1n1)

External links 

 Multi-dimensional Glossary

7-polytopes